Tambores is a small town partly in the Paysandú Department and partly in the Tacuarembó Department of western Uruguay.

Geography
The railroad track Montevideo - Tacuarembó - Rivera passes through the town.

History
On 21 August 1936, the existing populated nucleus here was elevated to "Pueblo" (village) by the Act of Ley N° 9.588. Until then, it had been head of the judicial section of "Salsipuedes". Its status was further elevated to "Villa" (town) on 15 October 1963 by the Act of Ley N° 13.167.

Population
In 2011 Tambores had a population of 1,561, of which 1,111 in Paysandú and 450 in Tacuarembó.
  
Source: Instituto Nacional de Estadística de Uruguay

Places of worship
 Immaculate Conception Parish Church (Roman Catholic, Sisters of Jesus Word and Victim)

References

External links
INE map of Tambores

Populated places in the Paysandú Department
Populated places in the Tacuarembó Department